Harold Thomas Hutcheson (May 16, 1920 – September 17, 1991) was an American professional basketball player. He played for the Denver Nuggets in the National Basketball League during the 1948–49 season and averaged 4.5 points per game.

References

1920 births
1991 deaths
Amateur Athletic Union men's basketball players
United States Army personnel of World War II
American men's basketball players
Denver Nuggets (1948–1950) players
Forwards (basketball)
Guards (basketball)
Northwest Missouri State Bearcats men's basketball players
Player-coaches